The Charles H. Murphy Sr. House in El Dorado, Arkansas, was built in 1925.  The -story house was designed in Tudor Revival style by architect Charles L. Thompson, and built in 1925–26, during El Dorado's oil boom years.  Charles Murphy was a major landowner, originally in the lumber business, who benefitted greatly from the oil boom due to the increased value of local real estate.  He founded the predecessor company to Murphy Oil, which is still headquartered in El Dorado.

The house was listed on the U.S. National Register of Historic Places in 1983, and included in the Murphy-Hill Historic District in 2007.

See also
National Register of Historic Places listings in Union County, Arkansas

References

Houses on the National Register of Historic Places in Arkansas
Tudor Revival architecture in Arkansas
Houses completed in 1925
Houses in Union County, Arkansas
National Register of Historic Places in Union County, Arkansas
Individually listed contributing properties to historic districts on the National Register in Arkansas
1925 establishments in Arkansas